Vasak Siwni (d. 452) was an Armenian prince, who was the lord of the principality of Syunik from 413 to 452, and also served as marzban (margrave) of Sasanian Armenia from 442 from 452. He renounced Christianity and joined the Sasanian forces against the leaders of the Armenian rebellion in 450/1, which culminated in the defeat of the rebel forces at the battle of Avarayr.

The contemporary Armenian historians Elishe and Lazar Parpetsi both give differing reports of the aftermath of the battle, albeit with the same outcome. According to Elishe, the Iranian general Mushkan Niusalavurt was greatly upset at the heavy casualties the Iranians had suffered in the battle, and thus gave Vasak Siwni free rein in Armenia. However, this resulted in even more bloodshed and turmoil, which led to the protest of many Armenian notables, and also by Mushkan himself. As a result, Vasak was imprisoned, while Adhur-Hormizd was installed the marzban of Armenia. According to Lazar, however, Mushkan was dismissed and sent back to Iran after he reported the Iranian losses to Yazdegerd II, who then appointed Adhur-Hormizd as the marzban of Armenia. Not long after, Vasak was imprisoned due to his deception towards the Armenians which had caused further turmoil.

References

Sources 
 
 

Sasanian governors of Armenia
5th-century Iranian people
5th-century Armenian people
5th-century rulers in Asia
5th-century rulers in Europe
Siunia dynasty
452 deaths
Princes of Syunik
Armenian people from the Sasanian Empire
Generals of Yazdegerd II
Converts to Zoroastrianism from Christianity